William Johnson (born 27 February 1959) is a former English cricketer.  Johnson was a right-handed batsman who bowled right-arm off break.  He was born in Sunderland, County Durham.

Johnson made his debut for Durham against Bedfordshire in 1986 Minor Counties Championship.  He played Minor counties cricket for Durham from 1986 to 1988, making 7 Minor Counties Championship appearances and 4 MCCA Knockout Trophy appearances.  He made his only List A appearance against Somerset in the 1988 NatWest Trophy.  He scored 16 runs in this match, before being dismissed by Gary Palmer.

References

External links
Bill Johnson at ESPNcricinfo
Bill Johnson at CricketArchive

1959 births
Living people
Cricketers from Sunderland
English cricketers
Durham cricketers